Jesse Hilton Stuart (August 8, 1906 – February 17, 1984) was an American writer, school teacher, and school administrator who is known for his short stories, poetry, and novels as well as non-fiction autobiographical works set in central Appalachia. Born and raised in Greenup County, Kentucky, Stuart relied heavily on the rural locale of northeastern Kentucky for his writings. Stuart was named the poet laureate of Kentucky in 1954.

Early life
Stuart was born near Riverton, Greenup County, Kentucky, to Mitchell and Martha (Hilton) Stuart on August 8, 1906. Stuart served in the US Navy during World War II but did not see combat as his mission in his life.

Naomi Deane Norris
In 1939, Stuart married Naomi Deane Norris, a school teacher. They settled in W Hollow and had one daughter, Jessica Jane. In Stuart's memoir, The Thread That Runs So True, he explains how he met Norris at Lonesome Valley. He was in college while she was still in high school; in fact, Stuart taught Norris in her last year of school.

Education
After being denied admission at three colleges, Stuart was finally accepted at and attended Lincoln Memorial University, located in Harrogate, Tennessee.  After graduating he returned to his home area and taught at Warnock High School in Greenup, Kentucky.  Later he was appointed principal at McKell High School, but resigned after one year to attend graduate school at Vanderbilt University, where Edwin Mims was one of his professors. He then served as superintendent of the Greenup County Schools before ending his career as an English teacher at Portsmouth High School in Portsmouth, Ohio.

Poetry
One day while Stuart was plowing in the field, he stopped and wrote the first line of a sonnet: "I am a farmer singing at the plow," the first line of the 703 sonnets he would collect in Man with a Bull-Tongue Plow (1934). The book was described by Irish poet George William Russell (who wrote poetry under the name of AE) as the greatest work of poetry to come out of America since Walt Whitman published Leaves of Grass. Stuart was named poet laureate for the Commonwealth of Kentucky in 1954, and in 1961 he received the annual award from the American Academy of Poets.

Novels
Stuart's first novel was Trees of Heaven (1940). Set in rural Kentucky, the novel tells the story of Anse Bushman, who loves working the land and wants more land. Stuart's style is simple and sparse. Taps for Private Tussie (1943) is perhaps his most popular novel, selling more than a million copies in only two years. The novel also received critical praise and won the Thomas Jefferson Memorial Award for the best Southern book of the year. In 1974, Gale Research (in American Fiction, 1900-1950) identified Jesse Stuart as one of the forty-four novelists in the first half of the 20th century with high critical acclaim. Jesse Stuart was the second youngest of that group (William Saroyan was one year younger).

Short stories
Stuart published about 460 short stories. He wrote his first short story "Nest Egg" when he was a sophomore in high school in 1923. The story is of a rooster at his farm, whose behavior was so dominant that it began attracting hens from other farms, leading to conflict with the neighbors. Twenty years later, he submitted the story unchanged to the Atlantic Monthly, which accepted the story and published it in February 1943; it was later collected in Tales from Plum Grove Hills.

One of his most anthologized stories is "Split Cherry Tree," first published in Esquire, January 1939. In this story, a high school teacher in a one-room schoolhouse keeps a boy after school to work and pay for damage he did to a cherry tree. The boy's uneducated father comes to school to argue with the teacher, but comes to appreciate the value of higher education.

Enduring classic autobiography
The theme of education appears often in Stuart's books. He described the role that teaching played in his life in The Thread that Runs So True (1949), though he changed the names of places and people. He first taught school in rural Kentucky at the age of 16 at Cane Creek Elementary School, which became Lonesome Valley in his book.  The Thread that Runs So True (1949) has become a classic of American education. Ruel Foster, a professor at West Virginia University, noted in 1968 that the book had good sales in its first year. At the time, he wrote, sales for the book had gone up in each successive year, an astonishing feat for any book. The book has remained continuously in print for more than 50 years.

Death
In May 1982, Jesse Stuart suffered a stroke that left him comatose. Stuart died on February 17, 1984, at Jo-Lin Nursing Home, near his boyhood home, in Ironton, Ohio. He was 77 years old.

Jesse Stuart State Nature Preserve
The natural settings of W Hollow were prominent throughout Stuart's writings.  Prior to his death he donated  of woodlands in W Hollow to the Office of Kentucky Nature Preserves.  The Jesse Stuart State Nature Preserve is dedicated to protecting the legacy of Stuart, and ensures that a significant portion of W Hollow will remain undeveloped in perpetuity.  The trail system is open to the public from dawn to dusk all year long.

Books by Jesse Stuart

Poetry
Man with a Bull-Tongue Plow, E.P. Dutton & Co., 1934
Album of Destiny, E. P. Dutton & Co., Inc., 1944
Kentucky is My Land, Dutton, 1952
Hold April, McGraw-Hill Book Company, Inc., 1962

Autobiographical
Beyond Dark Hills, E.P. Dutton & Company, Inc., 1938; Jesse Stuart Foundation, 1996, 
; Dramatic Publishing, 1958, 
The Year of My Rebirth 1956; Jesse Stuart Foundation, 1991, 
To Teach, To Love, World Pub. Co., 1970; Jesse Stuart Foundation, 1987,

Novels
Daughter of the Legend, McGraw-Hill, 1965; J. Stuart Foundation, 1994, 
; University Press of Kentucky, 1980, 
Taps for Private Tussie, E.P. Dutton, 1943; World Pub. Co., 1969

; University Press of Kentucky, 1986, 
Hie to the Hunters Whittlesey House, 1950; Jesse Stuart Foundation, 1996, 
Mr. Gallion's School, McGraw-Hill, 1967
The Land Beyond the River, McGraw-Hill, 1973, 
Cradle of the Copperheads, McGraw-Hill, 1988,

For Young Readers
The thread that runs so true, C. Scribner's Sons, 1950; Scribner, 1977, 
The Beatinest Boy Whittlesey House, 1953; Jesse Stuart Foundation, 1989, 
A Penny's Worth of Character, Whittlesey House, 1954; Jesse Stuart Foundation, 1993, 
Red Mule 1955; Jesse Stuart Foundation, 1993, 
A Ride with Huey, the Engineer 1966; Jesse Stuart Foundation, 1988, 
Old Ben 1970; Jesse Stuart Foundation, 1992,

Short story collections
Head o' W-Hollow, E. P. Dutton & co., inc., 1936; Books for Libraries Press, 1971, 
; University Press of Kentucky, 1979, 
Tales from the Plum Grove Hills E. P. Dutton & Company, inc., 1946; Jesse Stuart Foundation, 1997, 
Plowshares in Heaven, McGraw-Hill, 1958
Save Every Lamb, McGraw-Hill, 1964
Dawn of the Remembered Spring, McGraw Hill  1972
Come Gentle Spring McGraw-Hill, 1969; Jesse Stuart Foundation, 2008, 
A Jesse Stuart Harvest 1965; Mockingbird Books, 1976, 
My Land Has a Voice, McGraw-Hill, 1966
Come Back to the Farm McGraw-Hill, 1971; Jesse Stuart Foundation, 2001, 
32 Votes Before Breakfast, McGraw-Hill, 1974
New Harvest: Forgotten Stories of Kentucky's Jesse Stuart, Jesse Stuart Foundation, 2003,

Books about Jesse Stuart
 Jesse Stuart: His Life and Works, by Everetta Love Blair (University of South Carolina Press, 1967)
 Jesse Stuart, by Ruel E. Foster (Twayne, 1968)
 Jesse Stuart: An Extraordinary Life, by James M. Gifford and Erin R. Kazee (Jesse Stuart Foundation, 2010)
 Jesse: The Biography of an American Writer, Jesse Hilton Stuart, by H. Edward Richardson (McGraw-Hill, 1984)
 New Harvest: Forgotten Stories of Kentucky's Jesse Stuart, by David R. Palmore (Jesse Stuart Foundation, 2003)

References

External links

 Jesse Stuart papers held at the University of South Carolina Irvin Department of Rare Books and Special Collections.
http://www.loc.gov/rr/main/poets/kentucky.html
The Jesse Stuart Foundation
Jesse Stuart State Nature Preserve
"Split Cherry Tree" online
Jesse Stuart: First Editions A Virtual Exhibit, Marshall University.
Register of the Jesse Stuart Papers.  Marshall University. Includes biographical sketch.
WVU Libraries: Jesse Stuart Web Exhibit.
Kentucky People: Jesse Stuart at Our Old Kentucky Home
Office of Kentucky Nature Preserves

20th-century American novelists
American male novelists
20th-century American poets
20th-century American memoirists
American children's writers
Novelists from Kentucky
Poets from Kentucky
Poets Laureate of Kentucky
People from Greenup County, Kentucky
1906 births
1984 deaths
American education writers
Lincoln Memorial University alumni
American male poets
American male short story writers
20th-century American short story writers
20th-century American male writers
American male non-fiction writers
20th-century American educators
Schoolteachers from Kentucky